Steganomus is a genus of bees belonging to the family Halictidae.

The species of this genus are found in Africa and Asia.

Species:

Steganomus ennediensis 
Steganomus fulvipennis 
Steganomus gracilis 
Steganomus javanus 
Steganomus junodi 
Steganomus lieftincki
Steganomus nodicornis 
Steganomus ogilviae 
Steganomus taiwanus 
Steganomus tessmanni

References

Halictidae